Arthur Mourgue (born 2 May 1999) is a French professional rugby league footballer who plays as a  and  for the Catalans Dragons in the Super League and France at international level. 

He has previously played for Saint-Esteve in the Elite One Championship.

Background
Mourgue was born in Saint-Étienne, Auvergne-Rhône-Alpes, France.

Playing career
In 2018 he made his Catalans debut in the Super League against the Warrington Wolves.
On 9 October 2021, he played for Catalans in their 2021 Super League Grand Final defeat against St. Helens.

International career
He was selected in France 9s squad for the 2019 Rugby League World Cup 9s.
In France's opening match of the 2021 Rugby League World Cup against Greece, Mourgue scored a try and kicked seven goals during Les Blues 34-12 victory.

References

External links
Catalans Dragons profile
SL profile
France profile
French profile

1999 births
Living people
French rugby league players
Rugby league halfbacks
AS Saint Estève players
Catalans Dragons players
France national rugby league team players